The Rudyard Lake Steam Railway is a ridable miniature railway and the third railway of any gauge to run along the side of Rudyard Lake in Staffordshire, England.

Overview
After the NSR line closed down, a small narrow gauge train ran on the site for two years before moving via Suffolk to Trago Mills in Devon. The current line started in 1985 and is  gauge, and operates to a timetable. It was built by John Eastman of Congleton working on his own over a period of ten years. In October 2000, he sold the railway to Rudyard Lake Steam Railway Ltd, who have developed it since that date.

The railway was purchased by the Leek and Rudyard Railway on 18 December 2015. This company owns the assets of the former Isle of Mull Railway and has plans to combine the two railways at Rudyard.

Trains run at weekends and bank holidays from March to November, with more regular services from Easter to October and daily during school holidays. The railway is a member of Britains Great Little Railways and is a member of the Heritage Railway Association.

Route
It operates from Rudyard railway station to the dam, then along the side of the lake to terminate at Hunthouse Wood, about a mile south of the site of the old Cliffe Park railway station.

Locomotives

Many of the locomotives were named by the former owner's wife after the legends of King Arthur:

No 9 Pendragon (another Exmoor Steam Railway ) left the railway in 2019 and is now at the Astbury Light Railway.

A fleet of 13 carriages and a wide variety of goods wagons are also used. A further enclosed brake carriage was constructed in 2011 and brought into service in August and another 12 seat enclosed coach added in December 2012. The carriages from the closed Isle of Mull Railway are also slowly being brought back into service after restoration.

Facilities

Rudyard Station comprises Platform 1 with a shelter where the trains depart. A footbridge links this to Platform 2 where the cafe, a large covered picnic area, signal box and toilets are located. 
Platform 2 is, in fact, the original standard gauge platform built by the North Staffordshire Railway. The original flower beds and retaining walls are clearly visible. At a higher level than platform 1 is a good vantage point. To the South end of the station are the engine shed, water tower, coal bunker, storage shed and workshop.

The railway offers learn to drive a steam train courses, of either a half or full day for individuals or groups. Children's parties are hosted and the Platform 2 Cafe provides cold refreshments all year around whenever the railway is running.

References

Sources
 Hanton, Peter. The Heywood Society Journal No. 34, Spring 1994
 Williams John K. The Heywood Society Journal No. 52, Spring 2003
 Hanson, Michael. The Heywood Society Journal No. 56, Spring 2005

External links

, including current timetable details

1985 establishments in England
Railway lines opened in 1985
Heritage railways in Staffordshire
10¼ in gauge railways in England
Miniature railways in the United Kingdom
Articles containing video clips